International Christian Academy may refer to:

 International Christian Academy (Ivory Coast)
 Buenos Aires International Christian Academy
 Yokohama International Christian Academy

See also
 ICA (disambiguation)
 International Christian School (disambiguation)